The Conventicles Act 1670 is an Act of the Parliament of England (22 Car. II. c. 1) with the long title "An Act to prevent and suppress Seditious Conventicles". The Act imposed a fine on any person who attended a conventicle (any religious assembly other than the Church of England) of five shillings for the first offence and ten shillings for a second offence. Any preacher or person who allowed their house to be used as a meeting house for such an assembly could be fined 20 shillings and 40 shillings for a second offence.

Notes

References

Acts of the Parliament of England concerning religion
1670 in England
1670 in law
Christianity and law in the 17th century
1670 in religion